South India, also known as Peninsular India, consists of the peninsular southern part of India. It encompasses the Indian states of Andhra Pradesh, Karnataka, Kerala, Tamil Nadu, and Telangana, as well as the union territories of Lakshadweep and Puducherry, comprising 19.31% of India's area and 20% of India's population. Covering the southern part of the peninsular Deccan Plateau, South India is bounded by the Bay of Bengal in the east, the Arabian Sea in the west and the Indian Ocean in the south. The geography of the region is diverse with two mountain ranges – the Western and Eastern Ghats – bordering the plateau heartland. The Godavari, Krishna, Kaveri, Tungabhadra, Periyar, Bharathappuzha, Pamba, Thamirabarani, Palar, and Vaigai rivers are important perennial rivers.

The majority of the people in South India speak at least one of the four major Dravidian languages: Telugu, Tamil, Kannada and Malayalam (all 4 of which are among the 6 Classical Languages of India). Some states and union territories also recognize a minority language, such as Deccani Urdu in Telangana, and Tamil and French in Puducherry. Besides these languages, English is used by both the central and state governments for official communications and is used on all public signboards.

During its history, a number of dynastic kingdoms ruled over parts of South India, and the Muslim conquests in the Indian subcontinent across southern and southeastern Asia affected the history and culture in those regions. Major dynasties established in South India include the Satavahanas, Cheras, Cholas, Pandyas, Pallavas, Vishnukundinas, Chalukyas, Rashtrakutas, Bahmani, Deccan Sultanates, Cochin, Kakatiyas, Kadambas, Hoysalas, Zamorin, Vijayanagara, Maratha, Travancore, Arakkal, and Mysore. Jews, Saint Thomas Christians, Mappila Muslims, and Europeans entered India through the southwestern Malabar Coast of Kerala. Parts of South India were colonized under Portuguese India, French India and the British Raj. The Hyderabad State ruled by the Nizams was the last princely state of India.

South India witnessed sustained growth in per-capita income and population, structural changes in the economy, an increased pace of technological innovation. After experiencing fluctuations in the decades immediately after Indian independence, the economies of South Indian states have registered a higher-than-national-average growth over the past three decades. South India has the largest gross domestic product compared to other regions in India. The South Indian states lead in some socio-economic metrics of India. The HDI in the southern states is high and the economy has undergone growth at a faster rate than in most northern states. Literacy rates in the southern states is higher than the national average, with approximately 81% of the population capable of reading and writing. The fertility rate in South India is 1.9, the lowest of all regions in India.

Etymology

South India is also known as Peninsular India, and has been known by several other names too. The term "Deccan", referring to the area covered by the Deccan Plateau that covers most of peninsular India excluding the coastal areas, is an anglicised form of the Prakrit word dakkhiṇa derived from the Sanskrit word dakshiṇa meaning south. Carnatic, derived from "Karnāḍ" or "Karunāḍ" meaning high country, has also been associated with South India.

History

Historical references 

Historical South India has been referred to as Deccan, a prakritic derivative of an ancient term 'Dakshiṇa' or Dakshinapatha. The term had geographical as well as the geopolitical meaning and was mentioned as early as Panini (500 BCE).

Ancient and Medieval era 

Carbon dating shows that ash mounds associated with Neolithic cultures in South India date back to 8000 BCE. Artifacts such as ground stone axes and minor copper objects have been found in the Odisha region. Towards the beginning of 1000 BCE, iron technology spread through the region; however, there does not appear to be a fully developed Bronze Age preceding the Iron Age in South India. The region was in the middle of a trade route that extended from Muziris to Arikamedu linking the Mediterranean to East Asia. Trade with Phoenicians, Romans, Greeks, Arabs, Syrians, Jews, and Chinese began during the Sangam period (c. 3rd century BCE to c. 4th century CE). The region was part of the ancient Silk Road connecting the East with the West.

Several dynasties – such as the Cheras of Karuvur, the Pandyas of Madurai, the Cholas of Thanjavur, the Zamorins of Kozhikode, the Travancore royal family of Thiruvananthapuram, the Kingdom of Cochin, the Mushikas of Kannur, the Satavahanas of Amaravati, the Pallavas of Kanchi, the Kadambas of Banavasi, the Western Gangas of Kolar, the Rashtrakutas of Manyakheta, the Chalukyas of Badami, the Hoysalas of Belur, and the Kakatiyas of Orugallu – ruled over the region from the 6th century BCE to the 14th century CE. The Vijayanagara Empire, founded in the 14th century CE coverered much of the region of South India, controlling the lands of the modern states of Karnataka, Andhra Pradesh, Tamil Nadu, Kerala, Goa and some parts of Telangana and Maharashtra. It was established in 1336 by the brothers Harihara I and Bukka Raya I of the Sangama dynasty, members of a pastoralist cowherd community that claimed Yadava lineage. The empire rose to prominence as a culmination of attempts by the southern powers to ward off Perso-Turkic Islamic invasions by the end of the 13th century. At its peak, it subjugated almost all of South India's ruling families and pushed the sultans of the Deccan beyond the Tungabhadra-Krishna river doab region, in addition to annexing Gajapati Kingdom (Odisha) till Krishna river, thus becoming a notable power. It lasted until 1646, although its power declined after a major military defeat in the Battle of Talikota in 1565 by the combined armies of the Deccan sultanates. The empire is named after its capital city of Vijayanagara, whose ruins surround present day Hampi, now a World Heritage Site in Karnataka, India.  It was the last Indian dynasty to rule over the region. After repeated invasions from the Sultanate of Delhi and the fall of Vijayanagara empire in 1646, the region was ruled by Deccan Sultanates, the Maratha Empire, and polygars and Nayak governors of the Vijayanagara empire who declared their independence.

Colonial era
The Europeans arrived in the 15th century; and by the middle of the 18th century, the French and the British were involved in a protracted struggle for military control over South India. After the defeat of Tipu Sultan in the Fourth Anglo-Mysore War in 1799 and the end of the Vellore Mutiny in 1806, the British consolidated their power over much of present-day South India, with the exception of French Pondichéry. The British Empire took control of the region from the British East India Company in 1857. During the British colonial rule, the region was divided into the Madras Presidency, Hyderabad State, Mysore, Travancore, Cochin, Jeypore, and a number of other minor princely states. The region played a major role in the Indian independence movement. Of the 72 delegates who participated in the first session of the Indian National Congress at Bombay in December 1885, 22 hailed from South India.

Dravida Nadu movement

Dravida Nadu was a proposed nation for sovereign state for the speakers of the Dravidian languages in South India. The movement for Dravida Nadu was at its height from the 1940s to 1960s, but due to fears of Tamil hegemony, it failed to find any support outside Tamil Nadu. Initially, the demand of Dravida Nadu proponents was limited to Tamil-speaking regions, but it was later expanded to include other Indian states with a majority of Dravidian-speakers (Andhra Pradesh, Telangana, Kerala and Karnataka). Some of the proponents also included parts of Ceylon (Sri Lanka), Orissa and Maharashtra. Other names for the proposed sovereign state included "South India", "Deccan Federation" and "Dakshinapath".The States Reorganisation Act 1956, which created linguistic States, weakened the demand further. In 1960, the DMK leaders decided to withdraw their demand for a Dravida Nadu from the party programme at a meeting held in the absence of Annadurai. In 1963, the Government of India led by Jawaharlal Nehru, declared secessionism as an illegal act. As a consequence, Annadurai abandoned the "claim" for Dravida Nadu – now geographically limited to modern Tamil Nadu – completely in 1963.

Post-independence 

The demand for states to be organized on a linguistic basis was developed even before India achieved independence from British rule. The post-independence period saw the ascent of political movements for the creation of new states developed on linguistic lines. The movement to create a Telugu-speaking state out of the northern portion of Madras State gathered strength in the years after independence, and in 1953, the sixteen northern Telugu-speaking districts of Madras State became the new State of Andhra. After the independence of India in 1947, the region was organised into four states: Madras State, Mysore State, Hyderabad State and Travancore–Cochin. Andhra State was created in 1953 to protect the interests of Telugu people of Madras State from Tamil dominance. The States Reorganisation Act of 1956 reorganized the states on linguistic lines, resulting in the creation of the new states of Andhra Pradesh, Karnataka, Kerala, and Tamil Nadu. As a result of this Act,  Andhra Pradesh was created through the merger of Andhra State with the Telugu-speaking districts of Hyderabad State in 1956. Madras State retained its name and Kanyakumari district was added to it from the state of Travancore-Cochin. The state was subsequently renamed Tamil Nadu in 1968. The Marathi-speaking Marathwada region of Hyderabad State was transferred to Bombay State and ceased to be a part of South India. Kerala emerged from the merger of Malabar District and the Kasaragod taluk of South Canara districts of Madras State with Travancore–Cochin.

Mysore State was re-organised with the addition of the districts of Bellary and South Canara (excluding Kasaragod taluk) and the Kollegal taluk of Coimbatore district from Madras State; the districts of Belgaum, Bijapur, North Canara, and Dharwad from Bombay State; the Kannada-majority districts of Bidar, Raichur, and Gulbarga from the Hyderabad State; and the province of Coorg. Mysore State was renamed as Karnataka in 1973. The Union territory of Puducherry was created in 1954, comprising the previous French enclaves of Pondichérry, Karaikal, Yanam, and Mahé. The Laccadive Islands, which were divided between South Canara and the Malabar districts of Madras State, were united and organised into the union territory of Lakshadweep. Goa was created as a union territory by taking military actions against the Portuguese by the government of India, later it has been declared as a state due to its drastic growth. Telangana was created on 2 June 2014 by bifurcating Andhra Pradesh; and it comprises ten districts of the erstwhile state of Andhra Pradesh.

Geography 

South India is a peninsula in the shape of an inverted triangle bound by the Arabian Sea on the west, by the Bay of Bengal on the east and the Vindhya and Satpura ranges on the north. The Narmada river flows westwards in the depression between the Vindhya and Satpura ranges, which define the northern spur of the Deccan plateau. The Western Ghats run parallel to the Arabian Sea along the western coast and the narrow strip of land between the mountains and the sea forms the Konkan region. The Western Ghats continue south until Kanyakumari. Anai Mudi in the Anaimalai Hills  in Kerala is the highest peak in the Western Ghats. The Eastern Ghats run parallel to the Bay of Bengal along the eastern coast and the strip of land between them forms the Coromandel region. They are a discontinuous range of mountains, which have been eroded and quadrisected by the four major rivers of southern India, the Godavari, Mahanadi, Krishna, and Kaveri. These mountains extend from West Bengal to Odisha, Andhra Pradesh and Tamil Nadu, along the coast and parallel to the Bay of Bengal. Both mountain ranges meet at the Nilgiri mountains. The Nilgiris run in a crescent approximately along the borders of Tamil Nadu with northern Kerala and Karnataka, encompassing the Palakkad and Wayanad hills and the Sathyamangalam ranges, extending to the relatively low-lying hills of the Eastern Ghats on the western portion of the Tamil Nadu–Andhra Pradesh border, forming the Tirupati and Annamalai hills.

The low-lying coral islands of Lakshadweep are situated off the southwestern coast of India. The Andaman and Nicobar islands lie far off the eastern coast. The Palk Strait and the chain of low sandbars and islands known as Rama's Bridge separate the region from Sri Lanka, which lies off the southeastern coast. The southernmost tip of mainland India is at Kanyakumari where the Indian Ocean meets the Bay of Bengal and the Arabian Sea.

The Deccan plateau is the elevated region bound by the mountain ranges. It also slopes gently from West to East resulting in major rivers arising in the Western Ghats and flowing east into the Bay of Bengal. The volcanic basalt beds of the Deccan were laid down in the massive Deccan Traps eruption, which occurred towards the end of the Cretaceous period, between 67 and 66 million years ago. Layer after layer was formed by the volcanic activity that lasted 30,000 years; and when the volcanoes became extinct, they left a region of highlands with typically vast stretches of flat areas on top like a table. The plateau is watered by the east-flowing Godavari, Krishna, Kaveri, and Vaigai rivers. The major tributaries include the Pennar, Tungabhadra, Bhavani, and Thamirabarani rivers. The Western Ghats are the source of all Deccan rivers, which include the through Godavari River, Krishna River and Kaveri River, all draining into the Bay of Bengal. These rivers constitute 20% of India's total outflow.

Major gulfs include the Gulf of Mannar. Straits include the Palk Strait, which separates India from Sri Lanka; the Ten Degree Channel, which separates the Andamans from the Nicobar Islands; and the Eight Degree Channel, which separates the Laccadive and Amindivi Islands from the Minicoy Island to the south. Important capes include the Kanyakumari (formerly called Cape Comorin), the southern tip of mainland India; Indira Point, the southernmost point in India (on Great Nicobar Island); Rama's Bridge, and Point Calimere. The Arabian Sea lies to the west of India, the Bay of Bengal and the Indian Ocean lie to the east and south, respectively. Smaller seas include the Laccadive Sea and the Andaman Sea. There are four coral reefs in India, located in the Andaman and Nicobar Islands, the Gulf of Mannar, Lakshadweep, and the Gulf of Kutch. Important lakes includeVembanad Lake in Kerala, Kolleru Lake in Andhra Pradesh and Sasthamkotta Lake in Kerala.

Climate

The region has a tropical climate and depends on monsoons for rainfall. The tropical climate is experienced in a strip of south-western lowlands abutting the Malabar Coast, the Western Ghats; the islands of Lakshadweep and Andaman and Nicobar are also subject to this climate.

A tropical wet and dry climate, drier than areas with a tropical monsoon climate, prevails over most of the inland peninsular region except for a semi-arid rain shadow east of the Western Ghats. Once the dry northeast monsoon begins in September, most precipitation in India falls in Tamil Nadu, leaving other states comparatively dry. A hot semi-arid climate predominates in the land east of the Western Ghats and the Cardamom Hills. Without artificial irrigation, this region is not suitable for agriculture.

The southwest monsoon from June to September accounts for most of the rainfall in the region. The Arabian Sea branch of the southwest monsoon hits the Western Ghats along the coastal state of Kerala and moves northward along the Konkan coast, with precipitation on coastal areas west of the Western Ghats. The lofty Western Ghats prevent the winds from reaching the Deccan Plateau; hence, the leeward region (the region deprived of winds) receives very little rainfall. The Bay of Bengal branch of the southwest monsoon heads toward northeast India, picking up moisture from the Bay of Bengal. The Coramandel coast does not receive much rainfall from the southwest monsoon, due to the shape of the land. Tamil Nadu and southeast Andhra Pradesh receive rains from the northeast monsoon. The northeast monsoon takes place from November to early March, when the surface high-pressure system is strongest. The North Indian Ocean tropical cyclones occur throughout the year in the Bay of Bengal and the Arabian Sea, bringing devastating winds and heavy rainfall.

Flora and fauna 

There is a wide diversity of plants and animals in South India, resulting from its varied climates and geography. Deciduous forests are found along the Western Ghats while tropical dry forests and scrub lands are common in the interior Deccan plateau. The southern Western Ghats have rain forests located at high altitudes called the South Western Ghats montane rain forests, and the Malabar Coast moist forests are found on the coastal plains. The Western Ghats is one of the eight hottest biodiversity hotspots in the world and a UNESCO World Heritage Site.

Important ecological regions of South India are the Nilgiri Biosphere Reserve – located at the conjunction of Karnataka, Kerala and, Tamil Nadu in the Nilgiri Hills – and the Agasthyamala Biosphere Reserve - located at the conjunction of Kerala and, Tamil Nadu in the Agastya Mala hills - and the Cardamom Hills of Western Ghats. Bird sanctuaries – including Thattekad, Kadalundi, Vedanthangal, Ranganathittu, Kumarakom, Neelapattu, and Pulicat – are home to numerous migratory and local birds. Lakshadweep has been declared a bird sanctuary by the Wildlife Institute of India. Other protected ecological sites include the mangrove forests of Pichavaram, and the backwaters of Pulicat lake, in Tamil Nadu; and Vembanad, Ashtamudi, Paravur, and Kayamkulam lakes in Kerala. It is home to endangered aquatic species, including dolphins, dugongs, whales and sea cucumbers.

South India is home to one of the largest populations of endangered Bengal tigers and Indian elephants in India, being home to one-third of the tiger population and more than half of the elephant population, with 14 Project Tiger reserves and 11 Project Elephant reserves. Elephant populations are found in eight fragmented sites in the region: in northern Karnataka, along the Western Ghats, in Bhadra–Malnad, in Brahmagiri–Nilgiris–Eastern Ghats, in Nilambur–Silent Valley–Coimbatore, in Anamalai–Parambikulam, in Periyar–Srivilliputhur, and in Agasthyamalai Other threatened and endangered species found in the region include the grizzled giant squirrel, grey slender loris, sloth bear, Nilgiri tahr, Nilgiri langur, lion-tailed macaque, and the Indian leopard.

Transport

Air
Quilon Aerodrome at Kollam, was established under the kingdom of Travancore in 1920, but it was closed in 1932. In March 1930, a discussion initiated by pilot G. Vlasto led to the founding of the Madras Flying Club, which became a pioneer in pilot training in South India. On 15 October 1932, Indian aviator J. R. D. Tata flew a Puss Moth aircraft carrying mail from Karachi to Juhu aerodrome, Bombay; and the aircraft continued to Madras, piloted by Neville Vincent, a former Royal Air Force pilot and friend of Tata. Kannur had an airstrip used for commercial aviation as early as 1935 when Tata airlines operated weekly flights between Mumbai and Thiruvananthapuram – stopping at Goa and Kannur. Chennai International Airport and Trivandrum International Airport, both inaugurated in 1932 and now managed by the Airport Authority of India, are among the oldest existing airports in South India.

There are 11 international airports, 2 customs airports, 15 domestic airports, and 11 air bases in South India. Bengaluru, Chennai, Hyderabad, and Kochi international airports are amongst the 10 busiest in the country. Chennai International Airport serves as the Southern Regional Headquarters of the Airports Authority of India, the Southern Region comprising the states of Andhra Pradesh, Karnataka, Kerala, Tamil Nadu, and Telangana, and the union territories of Puducherry and Lakshadweep.

The Southern Air Command of the Indian Air Force is headquartered at Thiruvananthapuram, and the Training Command is headquartered at Bengaluru. The Air Force operates eleven air bases in Southern India including two in the Andaman and Nicobar Islands. In the region, the Indian Navy operates airbases at Kochi, Arakkonam, Uchipuli, Vizag, Campbell Bay, and Diglipur.

Restricted international airport

Road
The Golden Quadrilateral connects Chennai with Mumbai via Bangalore, and with Kolkata via Visakhapatnam. Bus services are provided by state-run transport corporations, namely the Andhra Pradesh State Road Transport Corporation, Tamil Nadu State Transport Corporation, Karnataka State Road Transport Corporation, Telangana State Road Transport Corporation, Kerala State Road Transport Corporation, and Puducherry Road Transport Corporation.

Rail

The Great Southern of India Railway Company was founded in England in 1853 and registered in 1859. Construction of track in the Madras Presidency began in 1859 and the  link from Trichinopoly to Negapatam and a link from Tirur to the Port of Beypore at Kozhikode on the Malabar Coast, which eventually got expanded into the Mangalore-Chennai line via Palakkad Gap were opened in 1861. The Carnatic Railway Company was founded in 1864 and opened a Madras–Arakkonam–Conjeevaram–Katpadi junction line in 1865. These two companies subsequently merged in 1874 to form the South Indian Railway Company. In 1880, the Great Indian Peninsula Railway, established by the British, built a railway network radiating from Madras. In 1879, the Madras Railway constructed a line from Royapuram to Bangalore; and the Maharaja of Mysore established the Mysore State Railway to build an extension from Bangalore to Mysore. In order to get access to the west coast, Malabar region of the country through Port of Quilon, Maharajah Uthram Thirunal of Travancore built the Quilon-Madras rail line jointly with the South Indian Railway Company and the Madras Presidency. The Madras and Southern Mahratta Railway was founded on 1 January 1908 by merging the Madras Railway and the Southern Mahratta Railway.

On 14 April 1951, the Madras and Southern Mahratta Railway, the South Indian Railway, and the Mysore State Railway were merged to form the Southern Railway, in the first zone of Indian Railways. The South Central zone was created on 2 October 1966 as the ninth zone of Indian Railways and the South Western zone was created on 1 April 2003. Most of the region is covered by the three zones, with small portions of the coasts covered by East Coast Railway and Konkan Railway, In 2019, the Government of India announced the formation of the South Coast Railway zone in the southeast, with headquarters at Visakhapatnam.  Hyderabad MMTS provides the suburban rail services in the city of Hyderabad.

The Nilgiri Mountain Railway is a UNESCO World Heritage Site.

Metro

There are currently 4 operational rapid transit (popularly known as 'metro') systems in South India, with Hyderabad Metro being the largest. As of December 2022, India has 822.038 km of operational metro lines and 16 systems. As of December 2022, South India has 205.06 km of operational metro lines and 16 systems. A further 237.06 km of lines are under construction.

 OP + U/C = Operational & Under-construction combined
 OP + U/C+ Planned = Operational, Under-construction & Planned Combined

Water
A total of 89 ports are situated along the southern seacoast: Andaman and Nicobar (23), Kerala (17), Tamil Nadu (15), Andhra Pradesh (12), Karanataka(10), Lakshadweep (10), Pondicherry (2). Major ports include those at Visakhapatnam, Chennai, Mangalore, Tuticorin, Ennore, Kakinada, and Kochi.

The Kerala backwaters are a network of interconnected canals, rivers, lakes, and inlets, a labyrinthine system formed by more than 900 km of waterways. In the midst of this landscape, there are a number of towns and cities, which serve as the starting and endpoints of transportation services and backwater cruises. Vizhinjam International Seaport also called The Port of Trivandrum is a mother port under construction on the Arabian Sea at Vizhinjam in Trivandrum, India. Once completed, it is estimated that this port will handle over 40% of India's transshipments, thereby reducing the country's reliance on ports at Dubai, Colombo, and Singapore.

The Eastern Naval Command and Southern Naval Command of the Indian Navy are headquartered at Visakhapatnam and Kochi, respectively. In the region, the Indian Navy has its major operational bases at Visakhapatnam, Chennai, Kochi, Karwar, and Kavaratti.

Economy

After independence, the economy of South India conformed to a socialist framework, with strict governmental control over private sector participation, foreign trade, and foreign direct investment. From 1960 to 1990, the South Indian economies experienced mixed economic growth. In the 1960s, Kerala achieved above-average growth while Andhra Pradesh's economy declined. Kerala experienced an economic decline in the 1970s while the economies of Karnataka, Tamil Nadu, and Andhra Pradesh consistently exceeded national average growth rates, due to reform-oriented economic policies. As of March 2015, there are 109 operational Special Economic Zones in South India, which is about 60% of the country's total. As of 2019–20, the total gross domestic product of the region is ₹67 trillion (US$946 billion). Tamil Nadu has the second-highest GDP and is the second-most industrialised state in the country after Maharashtra. With the presence of two major ports, an international airport, and a converging road and rail networks, Chennai is referred to as the "Gateway of South India."

Agriculture 
Over 48% of South India's population is engaged in agriculture, which is largely dependent on seasonal monsoons. Frequent droughts have left farmers debt-ridden, forcing them to sell their livestock and sometimes to commit suicide. Some of the main crops cultivated in South India include paddy, sorghum, pearl millet, pulses, ragi, sugarcane, mangoes, chilli, and cotton. The staple food is rice; the delta regions of Godavari, Krishna, and Kaveri are among the top rice producing areas in the country. Areca nut, coffee, tea, turmeric and other spices, and rubber are cultivated in the hills, the region accounting for 92% of the total coffee production in India. Other major agricultural products include poultry and silk. Kerala produces 97% of the national output of black pepper and accounts for 85% of the natural rubber in the country. Coconut, tea, coffee, cashew, and spices—including cardamom, vanilla, cinnamon, and nutmeg are the main agricultural products. Around 80% of India's export quality cashew kernels are prepared in Kollam. The key cash crop is Coconut and Kerala ranks first in the area of coconut cultivation in India. In 1960–61, about 70% of the Coconuts produced in India were from Kerala, which have reduced to 42% in 2011–12. Around 90% of the total Cardamom produced in India is from Kerala. India is the second-largest producer of Cardamom in world. The three southern states, Karnataka, Tamil Nadu, and Kerala, are home to coffee and tea gardens, rubber plantations, and spice crops, generating employment to more than 13 lakh people. Almost 40% of tea produced in the southern states is exported and 31% of pepper grown here, too, goes to other countries. South India produces more than 50% of total fish production in India.

Software Industry 

South India's urban centres are significant contributors to the Indian and global economy. According to the Globalization and World Cities Research Network, Bengaluru, Chennai, and Hyderabad are the South Indian cities most integrated with the global economy. Bengaluru is classified as an alpha world city, while Chennai and Hyderabad are beta world cities.

Bengaluru, Hyderabad, Chennai, Kochi and Thiruvananthapuram are amongst the major information technology (IT) hubs of India, with Bengaluru known as the Silicon Valley of India  and Hyderabad hosting biggest offices of Amazon (company), Microsoft outside United States. The presence of these hubs has spurred economic growth and attracted foreign investments and job seekers from other parts of the country.

Manufacturing industry 
In early 1960's many industrial corporations like APIIC (Andhra Pradesh), KIDC (Karnataka), KSIDC (Kerala), TIDC (TamilNadu) was set up to provides businesses with infrastructure such as land (open plot or built-up spaces), roads, water supply, drainage facilities and street lights. Salem Steel Plant (SSP), a unit of Steel Authority of India Limited (SAIL), is a steel plant involved in the production of stainless steel. It is located along the Salem — Bangalore National Highway 44 in the foothills of Kanjamalai in Salem district, Tamil Nadu, India. The plant has an installed capacity of 70,000 tonnes per annum in its cold rolling mill and 3,64,000 tonnes per annum in the hot rolling mill. It also has the country's first stainless steel blanking facility.

Chennai, known as the "Detroit of Asia", accounts for about 35% of India's overall automotive components and automobile output. South India is now home to major automobile companies like Ashok Leyland Limited, Hero MotoCorp, Isuzu Motors India, Kia Motors, Kobelco, Honda Motorcycle and Scooter India, Mahindra Reva, TAFE Tractors, Tata Motors, Toyota Kirloskar Motor Private Limited, TVS Motor, Volvo, Eicher, Ather Energy, BMW India, Mini, BMW Motorrad, Caterpillar Inc., Royal Enfield, Hyundai Motor India Limited, Daimler, BharatBenz, Yamaha Motor Company. Coimbatore supplies two-thirds of India's requirements of motors and pumps, and is one of the largest exporters of wet grinders and auto components, as well as jewellery. Andhra Pradesh is emerging as another automobile manufacturing hub.

Another major industry is textiles with the region being home to nearly 60% of the fiber textile mills in India.

Tourism 

Tourism contributes significantly to the GDP of the region, with three states – Tamil Nadu, Andhra Pradesh, Karnataka, and Telangana – among the top 10 states for tourist arrivals, accounting for more than 50% of domestic tourist visits. Tamil Nadu has the largest tourism industry in India with a percentage share of 21.31% and 21.86% of domestic and foreign tourist visits in the country. According to the 2020 Ministry of Tourism report, the number of domestic arrivals was at 494.8 million making the state the second most popular tourist destination in the country, and foreign arrivals numbered 6.86 million, the highest in the country, making it the most popular state for tourism in the country. In 2023, Kerala was listed at the 13th spot in The New York Times' annual list of places to visit and was the only tourist destination listed from India. Kerala was named by TIME magazine in 2022 among the 50 extraordinary destinations to explore in its list of the World’s Greatest Places.

Demographics

As per the 2011 census of India, the estimated population of South India was 252 million, around one fifth of the total population of the country. The region's total fertility rate (TFR) was less than the population replacement level of 2.1 for all states, with Kerala and Tamil Nadu having the lowest TFRs in India at 1.7. As a result, from 1981 to 2011 the proportion of the population of South India to India's total population has declined. The population density of the region is approximately 463 per square kilometer. Scheduled Castes and Tribes form 18% of the population of the region. Agriculture is the major employer in the region, with 47.5% of the population being involved in agrarian activities. About 60% of the population lives in permanent housing structures. 67.8% of South India has access to tap water, with wells and springs being major sources of water supply.

After experiencing fluctuations in the decades immediately after the independence of India, the economies of South Indian states have, over the past three decades, registered growth higher than the national average. While South Indian states have improved in some of the socio-economic metrics, poverty continues to affect the region as it does the rest of the country, although it has considerably decreased over the years. Based on the 2011 census, the HDI in the southern states is high, and the economy has grown at a faster rate than those of most northern states.

As per the 2011 census, the average literacy rate in South India is approximately 80%, considerably higher than the Indian national average of 74%, with Kerala having the highest literacy rate of 93.91%. South India has the highest sex ratio with Kerala and Tamil Nadu being the top two states. The South Indian states rank amongst the top 10 in economic freedom, life expectancy, access to drinking water, house ownership, and TV ownership. The poverty rate is at 19% while that in the other Indian states is at 38%. Of the three demographically related targets of the Millennium Development Goals set by the United Nations and expected to be achieved by 2015, Kerala and Tamil Nadu achieved the goals related to improvement of maternal health and of reducing infant mortality and child mortality by 2009.

List of metropolitan areas in South India 

This is a list of metropolitan areas by population in India. The 74th Amendment to the Indian Constitution defines a metropolitan area as: An area having a population of 10 Lakh or 1 Million or more, comprised in one or more districts and consisting of two or more Municipalities or Panchayats or other contiguous areas, specified by the Governor by public notification to be a Metropolitan area.
According to 2011 Census of India, top 10 metropolition areas in south India are

Languages

The largest linguistic group in South India is the Dravidian family of languages, of approximately 73 languages. The major languages spoken include Telugu, Tamil, Kannada, and Malayalam. Tulu is spoken by about 1.5 million people in coastal Kerala and Karnataka; Konkani, an Indo-Aryan language, is spoken by around 0.8 million people in the Konkan coast (Canara) and Kerala; Kodava Takk is spoken by more than half a million people in Kodagu, Mysore, and Bangalore. English is also widely spoken in urban areas of South India. Deccani Urdu is spoken by around 12 million Muslims in southern India. Telugu, Tamil, Kannada, Malayalam, Konkani, and Deccani Urdu are listed among the 22 official languages of India as per the Official Languages Act (1963). Tamil was the first language to be granted classical language status by the Government of India in 2004. Other major languages declared classical are Telugu (in 2008), Kannada (in 2008) and Malayalam (in 2013) These four languages have literary outputs larger than other literary languages of India.

Religion

Evidence of prehistoric religion in South India comes from scattered Mesolithic rock paintings depicting dances and rituals, such as the Kupgal petroglyphs of eastern Karnataka, at Stone Age sites.

Hinduism is the major religion today in South India, with about 84% of the population adhering to it, which is often regarded as the oldest religion in the world, tracing its roots to prehistoric times in India. Its spiritual traditions include both the Shaivite and Vaishnavite branches of Hinduism, although Buddhist and Jain philosophies were influential several centuries earlier. Ayyavazhi has spread significantly across the southern parts of South India. Shaiva Siddhanta philosophy is prominent among many communities.

Shaivism developed as an amalgam of pre-Vedic religions and traditions derived from the southern Tamil Dravidian Shaiva Siddhanta traditions and philosophies, which were assimilated in the non-Vedic Shiva-tradition. The religious history of South India is influenced by Hinduism quite notably during the medieval century. The twelve Alvars (saint-poets of Vaishnavite tradition) and sixty-three Nayanars (saint poets of Shaivite tradition) are regarded as exponents of the bhakti tradition of Hinduism in South India. Most of them came from the Tamil region and the last of them lived in the 9th century CE.

About 11% of the population follow Islam, which was introduced to South India in the early 7th century by Arab traders on the Malabar Coast, and spread during the rule of the Deccan Sultanates, from the 17th to 18th centuries. Muslims of Arab descent in Kerala are called Jonaka Mappila.

About 4% follow Christianity. According to tradition, Christianity was introduced to South India by Thomas the Apostle, who visited Muziris in Kerala in 52 CE and proselytized natives, who are called Nazrani Mappila.

Kerala is also home to one of the oldest Jewish communities in the world, who are supposed to have arrived on the Malabar coast during the reign of King Solomon.

Administration
South India consists of the five southern Indian states of Andhra Pradesh, Telangana, Karnataka, Kerala, and Tamil Nadu, as well as the union territories of Puducherry, and Lakshadweep. Puducherry and the five states each have an elected state government, while Lakshadweep is centrally administered by the president of India. Each state is headed by a Governor who is appointed by the President of India and who names the leader of the state legislature's ruling party or coalition as chief minister, who is the head of the state government.

Each state or territory is further divided into districts, which are further subdivided into revenue divisions and taluks / Mandals or tehsils. Local bodies govern respective cities, towns, and villages, along with an elected mayor, municipal chairman, or panchayat chairman, respectively.

States

  Andhra Pradesh was divided into two states, Telangana and a residual Andhra Pradesh on 2 June 2014. Hyderabad, located entirely within the borders of Telangana, is to serve as joint capital for both states for a period of time not exceeding ten years.

Union territories

Legislative representation

South India elects 132 members to the Lok Sabha, accounting for roughly one-fourth of the total strength. The region is allocated 58 seats in the Rajya Sabha, out of the total of 245.

The state legislatures of Tamil Nadu, Kerala and Puducherry are unicameral, while Andhra Pradesh, Karnataka, and Telangana have bicameral legislatures. States with bicameral legislatures have an upper house (Legislative Council) with members not more than one-third the size of the Assembly. State legislatures elect members for terms of five years. Governors may suspend or dissolve assemblies and can administer when no party is able to form a government.

Politics

Politics in South India is characterized by a mix of regional and national political parties. The Justice Party and Swaraj Party were the two major parties in the erstwhile Madras Presidency. The Justice Party eventually lost the 1937 elections to the Indian National Congress, and Chakravarti Rajagopalachari became the Chief Minister of the Madras Presidency.

During the 1920s and 1930s, the Self-Respect Movement, spearheaded by Theagaroya Chetty and E. V. Ramaswamy (commonly known as Periyar), emerged in the Madras Presidency. In 1944, Periyar transformed the party into a social organisation, renaming the party Dravidar Kazhagam, and withdrew from electoral politics. The initial aim was the secession of Dravida Nadu from the rest of India upon Indian independence. After independence, C. N. Annadurai, a follower of Periyar, formed the Dravida Munnetra Kazhagam (DMK) in 1948. The Anti-Hindi agitations of Tamil Nadu led to the rise of Dravidian parties that formed Tamil Nadu's first government, in 1967. In 1972, a split in the DMK resulted in the formation of the All India Anna Dravida Munnetra Kazhagam (AIADMK) led by M. G. Ramachandran. Dravidian parties continue to dominate Tamil Nadu electoral politics, the national parties usually aligning as junior partners to the major Dravidian parties, AIADMK and DMK.

Indian National Congress dominated the political scene in Tamil Nadu in the 1950s and 1960s under the leadership of K. Kamaraj, who led the party after the death of Jawaharlal Nehru and ensured the selection of Prime Ministers Lal Bahadur Shastri and Indira Gandhi. Congress continues to be a major party in Andhra Pradesh, Karnataka, and Kerala. The party ruled with minimal opposition for 30 years in Andhra Pradesh, before the formation of the Telugu Desam Party by Nandamuri Taraka Rama Rao in 1982. Two prominent coalitions in Kerala are the United Democratic Front, led by the Indian National Congress, and the Left Democratic Front, led by the Communist Party of India (Marxist). For the past fifty years, these two coalitions have been alternately in power; and E. M. S. Namboodiripad, the first elected chief minister of Kerala in 1957, is credited as the leader of the first democratically elected communist government in the world. The Bharatiya Janata Party and Janata Dal (Secular) are significant parties in Karnataka.

C. Rajagopalachari, the first Indian Governor General of India post independence, was from South India. The region has produced six Indian presidents, namely, Sarvepalli Radhakrishnan, V. V. Giri, Neelam Sanjiva Reddy, R. Venkataraman, K. R. Narayanan, and APJ Abdul Kalam. Prime ministers P. V. Narasimha Rao and H. D. Deve Gowda were from the region.

List of current state governments

Culture and heritage

Clothing

Ancient Tamil poetry, such as the Silappadhikaram, describes women in exquisite drapery or sari. Madisar is a typical style worn by Brahmin women from Tamil Nadu. Women wear colourful silk sarees on special occasions such as marriages.

It is usually wrapped around the waist and the legs and knotted at the waist. A colourful lungi with typical batik patterns is the most common form of male attire in the countryside.

People in urban areas generally wear tailored clothing, and western dress is popular. Western-style school uniforms are worn by both boys and girls in schools, even in rural areas.
Calico, a plain-woven textile made from unbleached, and often not fully processed, cotton, was originated at Calicut (Kozhikode), from which the name of the textile came, in South India, now Kerala, during the 11th century, where the cloth was known as Chaliyan. The raw fabric was dyed and printed in bright hues, and calico prints later became popular in the Europe.

Cuisine

Rice is the diet staple, while fish is an integral component of coastal South Indian meals. Coconut and spices are used extensively in South Indian cuisine. The region has a rich cuisine involving both traditional non-vegetarian and vegetarian dishes comprising rice, legumes, and lentils. Its distinct aroma and flavour is achieved by the blending of flavourings and spices, including curry leaves, mustard seeds, coriander, ginger, garlic, chili, pepper, cinnamon, cloves, green cardamom, cumin, nutmeg, coconut, and rosewater.

The traditional way of eating a meal involves being seated on the floor, having the food served on a banana leaf, and using clean fingers of the right hand to take the food into the mouth. After the meal, the fingers are washed; the easily degradable banana leaf is discarded or becomes fodder for cattle. Eating on banana leaves is a custom thousands of years old, imparts a unique flavor to the food, and is considered healthy.

Idli, dosa, uthappam, Pesarattu, appam, pongal, and paniyaram are popular breakfast dishes in Tamil Nadu, Andhra Pradesh, and Kerala. Rice is served with sambar, rasam, and poriyal for lunch. Andhra cuisine is characterised by pickles and spicy curries.  Famous dishes are Pesarattu, Ulava charu, Bobbatlu, Pootharekulu, and Gongura. Chettinad cuisine is famous for its non-vegetarian items, and Hyderabadi cuisine is popular for its biryani. Neer dosa, Chitranna, Ragi mudde, Maddur vada, Mysore pak, Obbattu, Bisi Bele Bath, Mangalore buns, Kesari bat, Akki rotti and Dharwad pedha are famous cuisines of Karnataka. Udupi Cuisine, which originates from Udupi located in the Coastal Kanara region of Karnataka is famous for its vegetarian dishes.
Coconut is native to Southern India and spread to Europe, Arabia, and Persia through the southwestern Malabar Coast of South India over the centuries. Coconut of Indian origin was brought to the Americas by Portuguese merchants. Black pepper is also native to the Malabar Coast of India, and the Malabar pepper is extensively cultivated there. During classical era, Phoenicians, Greeks, Egyptians, Romans, and Chinese were attracted by the spices including Cinnamon and Black pepper from the ancient port of Muziris in the southwestern coast of India.

During Middle Ages prior to the Age of Discovery which began with the end of the 15th century CE, the kingdom of Calicut (Kozhikode) on Malabar Coast was the centre of Indian pepper exports to the Red Sea and Europe at this time with Egyptian and Arab traders being particularly active. The Thalassery cuisine, a style of cuisine originated in the Northern Kerala over centuries, makes use of such spices.

Music and dance

The traditional music of South India is known as Carnatic music, which includes rhythmic and structured music by composers such as Purandara Dasa, Kanaka Dasa, Tyagayya, Annamacharya, Baktha Ramadasu, Muthuswami Dikshitar, Shyama Shastri, Kshetrayya, Mysore Vasudevachar, and Swathi Thirunal. The main instrument that is used in South Indian Hindu temples is the nadaswaram, a reed instrument that is often accompanied by the thavil, a type of drum instrument.

South India is home to several distinct dance forms such as Bharatanatyam, Kuchipudi, Andhra Natyam, Kathakali, Kerala Natanam, Koodiyattam, Margamkali, Mohiniaattam, Oppana, Ottamthullal, Theyyam, Vilasini Natyam, and Yakshagana. The dance, clothing, and sculptures of South India exemplify the beauty of the body and motherhood.

Cinema

Films done in regional languages are prevalent in South India, with several regional cinemas being recognized: Kannada cinema (Karnataka), Malayalam cinema (Kerala), Tamil cinema (Tamil Nadu), and Telugu cinema (Andhra Pradesh and Telangana). The first silent film in South India, Keechaka Vadham, was made by R. Nataraja Mudaliar in 1916. Mudaliar also established Madras's first film studio. The first Tamil talkie, Kalidas, was released on 31 October 1931, barely seven months after India's first talking picture, Alam Ara.

Swamikannu Vincent built the first cinema studio of South India, at Coimbatore, introducing the "tent cinema", which he first established in Madras and which was known as "Edison's Grand Cinemamegaphone". Filmmakers K. N. T. Sastry and B. Narsing Rao in Telugu cinema;  K Balachandar, Balu Mahendra, Bharathiraaja, and Mani Ratnam in Tamil cinema; Adoor Gopalakrishnan, Shaji N. Karun, John Abraham, and G. Aravindan in Malayalam cinema; and Girish Kasaravalli , Girish Karnad and P. Sheshadri in Kannada cinema produced realistic cinema in parallel with each other throughout the 1970s.

South Indian cinema has also had an influence on politics of Tamil Nadu. Prominent film personalities such as C N Annadurai, M G Ramachandran, M Karunanidhi, N. T. Rama Rao, and Jayalalithaa have become chief ministers of South Indian states. As of 2014, South Indian film industries contribute to 53% of the total films produced in India.

Literature

South India has an independent literary tradition dating back over 2500 years. The first known literature of South India is the poetic Sangam literature, which was written in Tamil 2500 to 2100 years ago. Tamil literature was composed in three successive poetic assemblies known as Tamil Sangams, the earliest of which, according to ancient tradition, were held on a now vanished continent far to the south of India. This Tamil literature includes the oldest grammatical treatise, Tholkappiyam, and the epics Silappatikaram and Manimekalai. References to Kannada literature appear from the fourth century CE. Telugu literature inscriptions. Poets such as Annamacharya made many contributions to this literature. A distinct Malayalam literature came about in the 13th century.

Architecture
South India has two distinct styles of rock architecture, the Dravidian style of Tamil Nadu, Andhra Pradesh and the Vesara style of Karnataka, Telangana.

Koil or Gudi Hindu temples of the Dravidian style, consist of porches or mantapas preceding the door leading to the sanctum. Monumental, ornate gate-pyramids, or gopurams – each topped by a kalasam, or stone finial – are the principal features in the quadrangular enclosures that surround the more notable temples along with pillared halls. A South Indian temple typically has a water reservoir called the Kalyani or Pushkarni.

The origins of the gopuram can be traced back to early structures of the Pallavas. Under the Pandya rulers in the twelfth century, gateways had become the dominant feature of a temple's outer appearance, eventually overshadowing the inner sanctuary which became obscured from view by the gopurams colossal size.

The Architecture of Kerala is a unique architecture that emerged in the southwestern part of India, which is in its striking contrast to Dravidian architecture, which is normally practised in other parts of South India. It has been performed/followed according to Indian Vedic architectural science (Vastu Shastra).

Health
All South Indian states ranks in top 10 in institutional delivery in India. Kerala has the highest institutional delivery percentage 99.8% and Telangana has the lowest in 91.5%.

As of 2018, number of Public facilities in South India.

As of 2017, Number of Government Hospitals and Beds in Rural & Urban Areas.

Education
The South India is home to some of the nation's largest and most prominent public and private institutions of higher education. Notable public colleges and universities in the South include:

Universities by state and type

The table below is correct .

List of all IIT's

List of all IIM's

List of all NIT's

List of all IIIT's

Sports
Cricket is by far the most popular sport in South India with International cricket matches attracting a sizeable number of spectators who are willing to pay more than the standard ticket price to get a chance to watch the match.

Association football
Football is second most popular sport in South India.

Indian Super League (ISL)

The Southern Derby or Southern Rivalry, is the name given to a football derby contested by any two of the three professional football clubs from South India—Bengaluru FC, Chennaiyin FC and Kerala Blasters FC. The geographical proximity of the clubs contributes significantly to the rivalries.

National Football Championship (Santosh Trophy)

The tournament was started in 1941 by Indian Football Association (IFA), which was the then de facto governing body of football in India. It was named after the former president of the IFA, Sir Manmatha Nath Roy Chowdhury, the Maharaja of Santosh who had died at the age of 61 in 1939.

Cricket
Cricket is the most popular sport. It is played by many people in open spaces throughout all states in South India.

Indian Premier League

Traditional Sports

 Jallikattu
 Malla-yuddha
 Gatta gusthi
 Pallanguzhi
 Vallam kali
 Nadan panthu kali

See also
 East India
 North India
 Northeast India
 Central India
 Western India
 Administrative divisions of India

Notes

References

External links 

 
Peninsulas of India
Regions of India
South Asia
Landforms of Andhra Pradesh
Landforms of Kerala
Landforms of Karnataka
Landforms of Tamil Nadu
Landforms of Telangana
Landforms of Lakshadweep
Landforms of Puducherry